Auburndale is a city in Polk County, Florida, United States. The population was 13,507 at the 2010 census. According to the U.S. Census estimates of 2019, the city had a population of 16,650. It is part of the Lakeland-Winter Haven, Florida Metropolitan Statistical Area.

History
Auburndale was founded in 1880 by Frank Fuller, who was seeking refuge from chilly winters in the Northeast United States. The place was originally named Sanatoria, from a hotel located there.  When the railroad arrived in the 1880s, the town was renamed Auburndale at the suggestion of settlers from Auburndale, Massachusetts. The New England town had been named from the opening line of the poem "The Deserted Village" by Oliver Goldsmith.
Early on, the city became a chosen destination for a number of America's most prominent artists.

Geography and climate

Auburndale is located within the Central Florida Highlands area of the Atlantic coastal plain with a terrain consisting of flatland interspersed with gently rolling hills.

Auburndale is located in the humid subtropical zone, as designated by (Köppen climate classification: Cfa).

Government
The city commission is made up of five commissioners elected from single-member districts. The mayor is elected from the commissioners by the voters. The city budget is $69 million.

Demographics

As of the census of 2000, there were 11,032 people, 4,119 households, and 3,002 families residing in the city. The population density was 2,113.5 inhabitants per square mile (816.0/km2). The racial makeup of the city was 81.13% White, 12.26% African American, 0.26% Native American, 0.88% Asian, 0.05% Pacific Islander, 3.46% from other races, and 1.96% from two or more races. Hispanic or Latino of any race were 8.10% of the population.

There were 4,119 households, out of which 35.3% had children under the age of 18 living with them, 52.1% were married couples living together, 15.7% had a female householder with no husband present, and 27.1% were non-families. 21.7% of all households were made up of individuals, and 9.8% had someone living alone who was 65 years of age or older. The average household size was 2.63 and the average family size was 3.02.

In the city, the population was spread out, with 27.2% under the age of 18, 9.0% from 18 to 24, 27.8% from 25 to 44, 20.8% from 45 to 64, and 15.3% who were 65 years of age or older. The median age was 36 years. For every 100 females, there were 92.2 males. For every 100 females age 18 and over, there were 89.6 males.

The median income for a household in the city was $34,184, and the median income for a family was $36,303. Males had a median income of $30,468 versus $21,232 for females. The per capita income for the city was $15,510. About 13.4% of families and 17.3% of the population were below the poverty line, including 28.3% of those under age 18 and 7.6% of those age 65 or over.

In 2010 Auburndale had a population of 13,507.  There were 4,933 households with 99.1% of the population living in households.  The racial and ethnic composition of the population was 71.7% non-Hispanic white, 12.8% black or African American, 0.4% Native American, 0.4% Asian Indian, 0.2% Chinese, 0.1% Japanese, 0.1% Korean, 0.1% Vietnamese, 0.1% other Asian, 0.1% non-Hispanic reporting some other race, 2.2% from two or more races and 13.1% Hispanic or Latino.  The largest number of Hispanics, at 7.1% were Mexicans, with 3.2% of the population being Puerto Ricans, 0.7% being Cubans and the remaining 2.1% being classified as "other Hispanic".

Transportation
The important freeways and highways in the Auburndale area are:
  - Just north of town, this is the main interstate highway in central Florida, leading westward to Lakeland and Tampa, and eastward to Orlando and Daytona Beach.
  (Polk Parkway) - This toll road provides Auburndale with quick access to I-4 to the north, and leads westward to southern Lakeland.
  - This divided highway leads westward to Lakeland and eastward to Lake Alfred.
  - Traverses from eastern Auburndale to Winter Haven, hence its name Havendale Boulevard.
  - This road leads to Polk City and I-4.

Mass transit
Auburndale is served by Winter Haven Area Transit's #12 & #50 routes.

Railroads are also important to Auburndale. The city contains two major railroad lines. The first being the CSX Carters Subdivision, and the other being the CSX Auburndale Subdivision. Amtrak uses both lines but does not stop in the city.

Airports
Two airports serve Auburndale, both of which are located in Winter Haven, east of the city. The Winter Haven Regional Airport along US 92 and the adjacent Jack Browns Seaplane Base located on the northeast shores of Lake Jessie.

Media

Auburndale is part of the Tampa/St. Pete television market, the 13th largest in the country and part of the local Lakeland/Winter Haven radio market, which is the 94th largest in the country.

Library
The Auburndale Public Library is a member of the Polk County Library Cooperative. The library is located at 100 West Bridgers Avenue Auburndale, Florida 33823. The library offers a number of services to all Polk County Residents, including 24/7 card catalog access.

Education
The  public schools in Auburndale are operated by the Polk County School Board. There are five elementary schools, Berkley Elementary (a charter school ), Auburndale Central Elementary, Lena Vista Elementary, Boswell Elementary and Caldwell Elementary, which feed into Stambaugh Middle School. Students from Berkley Elementary are admitted into Berkley Accelerated Middle School (another charter school), while other students wishing to apply are put on a waiting list. Auburndale High School and Polk Pre-Collegiate Academy (PPCA) are the only high schools in Auburndale, although nearby Tenoroc High School serves students in both Auburndale and Lakeland.

Southern Technical College operates a campus in Auburndale. Nearby in Lakeland, Florida there is the main campus Florida Polytechnic University.

References

External links

 City of Auburndale

 
Cities in Polk County, Florida
Populated places established in 1880
1880 establishments in Florida
Cities in Florida